Kasikeu is a settlement in Makueni County, Kenya.

Populated places in Eastern Province (Kenya)
Makueni County